Sikensi Department is a department of Agnéby-Tiassa Region in Lagunes District, Ivory Coast. In 2021, its population was 125,897 and its seat is the settlement of Sikensi. The sub-prefectures of the department are Gomon and Sikensi.

History
Sikensi Department was created in 2005 as a second-level subdivision via a split-off from Dabou Department. At its creation, it was part of Lagunes Region.

In 2011, districts were introduced as new first-level subdivisions of Ivory Coast. At the same time, regions were reorganised and became second-level subdivisions and all departments were converted into third-level subdivisions. At this time, Sikensi Department became part of Agnéby-Tiassa Region in Lagunes District.

Notes

Departments of Agnéby-Tiassa
2005 establishments in Ivory Coast
States and territories established in 2005